Sacred Ground is a 1983 American Western film directed by Charles B. Pierce and starring Tim McIntire, L. Q. Jones and Jack Elam. The film was shot in several outdoor locations in Oregon.

Plot
Set in the year 1861, Matt Colter, a mountain man is traveling across the great divide with his young Indian bride, Little Doe. They cross paths with a Paiute party, a beautiful young woman Wannetta watches the mountain man and his pretty Indian bride. Ostracized by the white and Indian community, they are forced to leave and find a new home. They come across a trading post, where the owner warns Matt about his traveling through Paiute country.

The couple travel more and after crossing the river they come across the ruins of a cabin. Matt and Little Doe rebuild the cabin and make it their home. Seasons change and Matt affectionately pats his wife tummy as Little Doe is expecting. Little Doe finds bone remains and later tells Matt that the shelter they rebuilt, the cabin, that unbeknownst to them, is on sacred Paiute burial ground. Little Doe tells Matt that the spirits of the ground surround her and her unborn child.

One day a Paiute party call on Matt and yell. Due to a language barrier, they are unable to communicate. As Matt retreats back into the cabin he notices that Little Doe goes into labor. The Paiutes attack the couple by destroying the cabin with little Doe inside. In labor, Little Doe is fatally injured and Matt pulls her out of the destroyed cabin. Matt carries his wife to the river as the Paiute warriors look on. Many Paiute women are crossing the river to bury their own dead near the destroyed cabin. As the Paiute party lift their dead onto the scaffolds, the pray and sing. The beautiful woman who lost her child holds up her dead baby's cradleboard onto the scaffold. Matt is helping Little Doe deliver their child as she dies. Suddenly the young baby cries as the Paiutes leave their sacred burial ground.

Matt leaves with his newborn baby and meets up with a lone mountain man who tells him he needs to feed the child. Wannetta has recently had a child but it had died. Matt and the crazy mountain man kidnap her to use as a wet nurse. She nurses and bonds with the baby. The Paiute war party later places a signal for Wannetta to kill the mountain man's horse so they will be forced to travel on foot. She does not and she and the child are later kidnapped by the Paiute war party.

Wannetta is later banished from the tribe as she disobeyed them for not killing the horse. She is stripped of her furs and told to leave. Both women and men yell and throw rocks at her. Determined to find his son, Colter seeks the help of his friend, mountain man Lum Witcher.

Cast
 Tim McIntire as Matt Colter
 L. Q. Jones as Tolbert Coleman 
 Jack Elam as Lum Witcher
 Mindi Miller as Wannetta
 Elroy Phil Casados as Prairie Fox
 Serene Hedin as Little Doe
 Lefty Wild Eagle as Medicine Man
 Larry Kenoras as Brave Beaver
 Vermon Foster as Wounded Leg
 Franklin Fritz as Baby Colter
 Danny Wilson as Lone Brave
 Ben Mitchell as Warriors 
 Jerald Jackson, Jr. as Warriors
 Ronnie Wilson as Warriors 
 Aaron Wright as Warriors 
 Randy Sheppard as Warriors 
 Donald Wilson as Warriors 
 Thurman Parrish as Warriors 
 Lesile Anderson as Warriors 
 Fernando Herrera as Warriors
 Darin Wright as Warriors 
 Arnold Gallagher as Warriors
 Cora Lee Joe as Indian Women
 Della Wilson as Indian Women
 Marjorie Jackson as Indian Women
 Natalie Jackson as Indian Women
 Mary Sheppard as Indian Women
 Bergie Jackson as Indian Women
 Glenda Foster as Indina Women
 Laura Hecocta as Indian Women
 Adeline Jackson as Indian Women

DVD details
 Release date: January 1, 2003 
 Full Screen 
 Region: 1
 Aspect Ratio: 1.33:1 
 Audio tracks: English  
 Subtitles: English 
 Running time: 100 minutes

See also
 Windwalker
 Pacific International Enterprises

External links
 
 
 Official Site (Archive)

1983 films
1983 Western (genre) films
American Western (genre) films
Films directed by Charles B. Pierce
Films set in 1861
Films shot in Oregon
Films about Native Americans
1980s English-language films
1980s American films